The  Arizona Rattlers season was the twenty-third season for the arena football franchise in the Arena Football League. The team was coached by Kevin Guy and played their home games at Talking Stick Resort Arena. The Rattlers finished with a 14–4 record, with two of the losses coming at the hands of the San Jose SaberCats.

Standings

Schedule

Regular season
The 2015 regular season schedule was released on December 19, 2014.

Playoffs

Roster

References

Arizona Rattlers
Arizona Rattlers seasons
Arizona Rattlers
2010s in Phoenix, Arizona